Conyers is a given name. Notable people with the name include:

Conyers Clifford (c. 1566 – 1599), English politician and military commander
Conyers Darcy (c. 1685 – 1758), British Army officer and politician
Conyers Darcy, 7th Baron Darcy de Knayth (1570–1653), English nobleman
Conyers Darcy, 1st Earl of Holderness (1598/99–1689), English nobleman
Conyers Darcy, 2nd Earl of Holderness (1622–1692), English nobleman
Conyers Middleton (1683–1750), English clergyman 
Conyers Kirby (1884–1946), English footballer
Conyers Herring (1914–2009), American physicist

See also
Conyers (surname)
Conyers baronets